Compugen refers to at least two different companies:

Compugen (Canadian company) – Canadian IT company
Compugen (Israeli company) – publicly traded Israeli drug discovery company